Grand Marais is a community in Manitoba, Canada within the Rural Municipality of St. Clements. It is located immediately south of Grand Beach Provincial Park on Lake Winnipeg at the base of Grand Marais Point.

The community forms part of a Statistics Canada designated place named Grand Marais/Grand Beach.

Demographics 

See also 
List of designated places in Manitoba

References 

 Geographical Names of Manitoba - Grand Marais (page 98) - the Millennium Bureau of Canada

Unincorporated communities in Interlake Region, Manitoba